

This is a list of properties and districts listed on the National Register of Historic Places in Alaska.  There are approximately 400 listed sites in Alaska.  Each of the state's 30 boroughs and census areas has at least two listings on the National Register, except for the Kusilvak Census Area, which has none.

Numbers of listings by borough or census area 
The following are approximate tallies of current listings in Alaska on the National Register of Historic Places. These counts are based on entries in the National Register Information Database as of April 24, 2008 and new weekly listings posted since then on the National Register of Historic Places web site. There are frequent additions to the listings and occasional delistings, and the counts here are not official. Also, the counts in this table exclude boundary increase and decrease listings which modify the area covered by an existing property or district and which carry a separate National Register reference number.

See also
List of National Historic Landmarks in Alaska

References

External links

 Aviation history in Alaska — National Register of Historic Places travel itinerary

 
Alaska